Bennet Nathaniel Lubell  (August 15, 1916 – September 17, 2006) was an American three-time Olympian fencer.

Early and personal life
Lubell was born in New York City, and was Jewish. Later in life he lived in Fort Lee, New Jersey.

Fencing career
He fenced for the City College of New York, graduating in 1936, and Lubell was inducted into the CCNY Athletic Hall of Fame in 1969.

Lubell won the United States Foil Fencing Championship in 1948, fencing for the Fencers Club of New York. He also helped the Fencers Club win the team foil in 1949-51, 1953, and 1955-56 at the Amateur Fencers League of America (AFLA) Championships.

At the 1951 Pan American Games, Lubell won the bronze medal in individual foil, team gold medals in foil and saber, and the silver medal in team epee. The entire USA Foil Fencing Team at the 1956 Olympics was Jewish, with the other Jewish fencers being Daniel Bukantz, Albert Axelrod, Harold Goldsmith, and Byron Krieger.

Lubell competed for the United States in foil at the 1948 Summer Olympics in London, the 1952 Summer Olympics in Helsinki, and the 1956 Summer Olympics in Melbourne.

He coached fencing at West Point from 1962-66. Lubell served as President of The New York Fencers Club during the 1970s.

Artist career
Lubell was also a courtroom artist at the Nuremberg Trials, and later designed 15 US postage stamps.

References

External links
 

1916 births
2006 deaths
American artists
American male foil fencers
American male sabre fencers
American male épée fencers
Olympic fencers of the United States
Fencers at the 1948 Summer Olympics
Fencers at the 1952 Summer Olympics
Fencers at the 1956 Summer Olympics
Sportspeople from New York (state)
Pan American Games medalists in fencing
Pan American Games gold medalists for the United States
Pan American Games silver medalists for the United States
Pan American Games bronze medalists for the United States
Jewish male foil fencers
City College of New York alumni
CCNY Beavers fencers
Jewish American sportspeople
Sportspeople from New York City
People from Fort Lee, New Jersey
United States Military Academy faculty
Fencers at the 1951 Pan American Games
Medalists at the 1951 Pan American Games
20th-century American Jews
21st-century American Jews
Jewish male sabre fencers
Jewish male épée fencers
20th-century American people
21st-century American people